The Papua New Guinea national football team is the national team of Papua New Guinea and is controlled by the Papua New Guinea Football Association. Its nickname is the Kapuls, which is Tok Pisin for Cuscus.

Papua New Guinea's highest ever FIFA ranking was 153, in June 2017. As of June 2019, the country was ranked 171 out of 211 countries. This was a drop of 2 places from May 2019. Papua New Guinea had previously left the FIFA rankings, having not competed in a match between July 2007 and August 2011. Their matches at the 2015 Pacific Games saw them return to the rankings, and they competed in the 2016 OFC Nations Cup in June 2016; they reached the final, but lost to New Zealand 4–2 on penalties after the score was tied at 0–0 after extra time.

History

1963–1978

The Papuan national team played its first match at the 1963 South Pacific Games, where it fell to Fiji 3-1 and was eliminated. At the 1966 South Pacific Games they reached the third place match but lost to the New Hebrides. Three years later they reached the same stage, and defeated the Fijian team 2-1 to win the bronze medal.

At 1971 South Pacific Games, after losing in the semi-finals to New Caledonia, they were beaten 8-1 by Tahiti in the third place game. Four years later, at the 1975 Games, they were beaten in the group stage by Tahiti and New Caledonia and thus eliminated in the first round.

1979–1995
At the 1979 South Pacific Games they lost in the quarter-finals 3–2 against the Solomon Islands, and in the first phase of the consolation tournament they were beaten 2–0 at the hands of the New Hebrides. The following year they played in the 1980 Oceania Cup, the precursor to the OFC Nations Cup, where despite beating the New Hebrides team, their losses to Australia and New Caledonia left them out at the first phase.

At 1983 South Pacific Games they lost the match for third place against the New Caledonian team. In the 1987 edition they won the bronze medal again by beating Vanuatu 3-1. Even so, in the two subsequent editions, 1991 and 1995, they were eliminated in the first phase.

1996–2012
After an absence in three editions of the OFC Nations Cup, due to the poor results obtained in the Melanesia Cup, they qualified for the 2002 tournament. They were only able to salvage a point in a 0-0 draw against the Solomon Islands and bowed out in the first round. In 2003 South Pacific Games they had a poor performance and in five games only obtaining four points.

After not participating in 2007, which served as qualification for the 2008 OFC Nations Cup, they were eliminated in the first phase at 2011 Pacific Games by having worse goal difference than Tahiti, with whom they tied on points. In the 2012 OFC Nations Cup they drew with Fiji and lost to the Solomon Islands and New Zealand, again being eliminated in the group stage.

2013–present 
In 2015 Papua New Guinea was designated to host the 2016 OFC Nations Cup. In the group stage, the Papuan team drew 1-1 with New Caledonia, 2-2 against Tahiti and beat Samoa 8-0. After achieving victory in the semi-finals, 2–1 against the Solomon Islands, they lost on penalties to New Zealand in the final after drawing 0–0 in regulation time.

Kit sponsorship

Results and fixtures
For all past match results of the national team, see the team's results page.

In March 2022, Papua New Guinea will play their first matches since they took part in the 2019 Pacific Games.

2022

Coaching history

 Richard Tamari Nagai (1996–1998)
 John Davani (2002)
 Steve Cain (2002)
 Ludwig Peka (2003–2004)
 Marcos Gusmão (2004–2011)
 Frank Farina (2011–2013)
 Mike Keeney (2013)
 Wynton Rufer (2014–2015)
 Flemming Serritslev (2015–2018)
 Bob Morris (2019–2021)
 Marcos Gusmão (2021–2022)
 Santiago Marina (2022-present)

Current squad
The following players were called up for the FIFA World Cup qualification matches in March 2022.

Caps and goals correct as of 27 March 2022, after the match against Solomon Islands.

Player records

Players in bold are still active with Papua New Guinea.

Most capped players

Top goalscorers

Competitive record

FIFA World Cup

* Although initially listed by FIFA as having entered the 2010 World Cup, PNG did not enter the football tournament at the 2007 South Pacific Games, which was used as the preliminary round of the Oceanian zone qualification tournament.

OFC Nations Cup

*Denotes draws include knockout matches decided via penalty shoot-out.

Pacific Games

Head-to-head record
Up to matches played on 20 July 2019.

See also
 Papua New Guinea women's national football team

References

External links
 Papua New Guinea Football Association
 "Latest Papua New Guinea Football News", Oceania Football Federation
 National Football Teams
 Pictorial History of PNG Football Kits
 National football team of Papua New Guinea picture

 
Oceanian national association football teams